William Amar Keys  (born October 26, 1977) is a retired American professional basketball player and basketball coach. At a height of 6'2" (1.88 m) and a weight of 210 lbs. (95 kg), he played at the point guard position. He currently is a men's basketball assistant coach at Northern New Mexico College in Espanola, New Mexico.

College career
After playing high school basketball at Hugh Manley High School in Chicago, Illinois, Keys played college basketball at Northeastern Illinois University, with the Northeastern Illinois Golden Eagles, from 1995–98, and at New Mexico State University, with the New Mexico State Aggies, from 1998-00. He was named to the 1999-00 season's All-Big West Conference First Team.

Professional career
In February 2001, Keys signed with Grindavík of the Icelandic Úrvalsdeild karla. In his debut, he scored a season high 47 points along with 18 rebounds an 7 assists. In three regular season games, he averaged 38.7 points, 12.7 rebounds and 5.7 assists. In the playoffs, Grindavík lost to Tindastóll, 1-2, in the first round with Keys averaging 26.0 points, 4.0 rebounds and 3.0 assists.

Keys played with the Miami Heat during their 2002-03 NBA season training camp, but he did not play in any official NBA games with the club. He then played with the New York Knicks' NBA Summer League team, in the summer of 2003. Keys then won the 2004 CBA championship with the Dakota Wizards.

In the summer of 2004, he played with the NBA Summer League teams of both the Detroit Pistons and the Denver Nuggets. He then played with Nuggets during their 2004-05 NBA season training camp, but he did not play in any official NBA games with the club. He next played with the NBA Summer League teams of both the Portland Trail Blazers and the Houston Rockets, in the summer of 2005.

Keys also played in the three major European national domestic basketball leagues, the Italian LBA League, the Spanish ACB League, and the Greek Basket League. In 2009, he extended his contract with the EuroLeague club Maroussi. He retired from playing professional basketball in 2014.

Coaching career
Keys began his basketball coaching career in 2014, when he became an assistant coach at Centennial High School, in Las Cruces, New Mexico. He then became the head coach at Mayfield High School, in Las Cruces, New Mexico, in 2015.

References

External links
Euroleague.net Profile
Draftexpress.com Profile
Eurobasket.com Profile
Greek Basket League Profile
Spanish League Profile 
Italian League Profile 
Úrvalsdeild Profile 

1977 births
Living people
A.E.L. 1964 B.C. players
American men's basketball coaches
American expatriate basketball people in Finland
American expatriate basketball people in Greece
American expatriate basketball people in Iceland
American expatriate basketball people in Israel
American expatriate basketball people in Italy
American expatriate basketball people in Spain
American expatriate basketball people in Ukraine
American expatriate basketball people in Venezuela
American men's basketball players
Basket Zaragoza players
Basketball players from Chicago
BC Budivelnyk players
CB Gran Canaria players
Cocodrilos de Caracas players
Dakota Wizards (CBA) players
Fargo-Moorhead Beez (CBA) players
Grindavík men's basketball players
Hapoel Tel Aviv B.C. players
High school basketball coaches in the United States
Israeli Basketball Premier League players
Liga ACB players
Maroussi B.C. players
New Mexico Slam players
New Mexico State Aggies men's basketball players
Nilan Bisons players
Northeastern Illinois Golden Eagles men's basketball players
Pallacanestro Varese players
Panionios B.C. players
Point guards
Roseto Sharks players
Sportspeople from Chicago
Úrvalsdeild karla (basketball) players